Arfwedson is a surname. Notable people with the surname include: 

Camilla Arfwedson (born 1981), English actress
Carl Abraham Arfwedson (1774-1861), Swedish silk merchant and artist
Charlotta Arfwedson (1776-1862), Swedish countess and artist
Johan August Arfwedson (1792–1841), Swedish chemist